Mark Arnold Urman (November 24, 1952 – January 12, 2019) was an American film executive, producer and distributor.

References

1952 births
2019 deaths
People from the Bronx
People from Montclair, New Jersey
Film producers from New York (state)